Alfred Brendel KBE (born 5 January 1931) is an Austrian classical pianist, poet, author, composer, and lecturer who is held in high regard for his performances of Mozart, Schubert, Schoenberg, and Beethoven.

Biography

Brendel was born in Wizemberk,  Czechoslovakia (now Loučná nad Desnou, Czech Republic) to a non-musical family. They moved to Zagreb, Yugoslavia (now Croatia), when Brendel was three years old and he began piano lessons there at the age of six with Sofija Deželić. He later moved to Graz, Austria, where he studied piano with Ludovica von Kaan at the Graz Conservatory and composition with Artur Michel. Towards the end of World War II, the 14-year-old Brendel was sent back to Yugoslavia to dig trenches.

After the war, Brendel composed music as well as continued to play the piano, to write and to paint. However, he never had more formal piano lessons and, although he attended master classes with Edwin Fischer and Eduard Steuermann, he was largely self-taught after the age of 16.

Brendel gave his first public recital in Graz at the age of 17. He called it "The Fugue in Piano Literature", and as well as fugal works by Johann Sebastian Bach, Johannes Brahms and Franz Liszt, it included a sonata of Brendel's own composition. In 1949 he won fourth prize in the Ferruccio Busoni Piano Competition in Bolzano, Italy. He then toured throughout Europe and Latin America, slowly building his career and participating in a few masterclasses of Paul Baumgartner, Eduard Steuermann and Edwin Fischer.

At the age of 21, in 1952, he made his first solo recording, Franz Liszt's Weihnachtsbaum, the work's world premiere recording. His first concerto recording, Sergei Prokofiev's Piano Concerto No. 5 had been made a couple of years earlier. He went on to make a string of other records, including three complete sets of the Beethoven piano sonatas (one on Vox Records and two on Philips Records). He was the first performer to record the complete solo piano works of Beethoven. He has also recorded works by Liszt, Brahms (including Brahms' concertos), Robert Schumann and particularly Franz Schubert. An important collection of Alfred Brendel is the complete Mozart piano concertos recorded with Sir Neville Marriner and the Academy of St Martin in the Fields, which is included in the Philips 180 CD complete Mozart Edition. He has recorded or performed little of the music of Frédéric Chopin, but not because of any lack of admiration for the composer. He considers Chopin's Preludes "the most glorious achievement in piano music after Beethoven and Schubert".

Brendel recorded extensively for the Vox label, providing them his first of three sets of the complete Beethoven sonatas. His breakthrough came after a recital of Beethoven at the Queen Elizabeth Hall in London, the day after which three major record labels called his agent. Around this time he moved to Hampstead, London, where he still lives. Since the 1970s, Brendel has recorded for Philips Classics Records. Brendel completed many tours in Europe, the United States, South America, Japan and Australia. He had a particularly close association with the Vienna and Berlin Philharmonic Orchestra, but played regularly with all major orchestras in the US and elsewhere. Brendel has performed many cycles of the Beethoven Sonatas and Concertos, and was one of the few pianists who, in later years, could continue to fill large halls. He is only the third pianist (after Emil von Sauer and Wilhelm Backhaus) to have been awarded honorary membership of the Vienna Philharmonic, and he was awarded the Hans von Bülow Medal by the Berlin Philharmonic.

Reviewing his 1993 Beethoven: The Late Piano Sonatas (Philips Duo 438374), Damian Thompson of The Daily Telegraph described it as "a more magisterial approach ... sprinkled with touches of Brendel's strange, quirky humour."

In April 2007 Brendel was one of the initial signatories of the "Appeal for the Establishment of a Parliamentary Assembly at the United Nations".

In 2009 Brendel was featured in the award-winning German-Austrian documentary Pianomania, about a Steinway & Sons piano tuner, which was directed by Lilian Franck and Robert Cibis. The film premiered theatrically in North America, where it was met with positive reviews by The New York Times, as well as in Asia and throughout Europe, and is a part of the Goethe-Institut catalogue.

Work

Brendel frequently performed the music of Haydn, Beethoven, Schubert and Mozart. He has played relatively few 20th century works but has performed Arnold Schoenberg's Piano Concerto.

Brendel was lauded by music critic Michael Steinberg as "the new Schnabel", whereas NY Times critic Harold C. Schonberg noted that some critics and specialists accused the pianist of "pedanticism". Brendel's playing is sometimes described as being "cerebral", and he has said that he believes the primary job of the pianist is to respect the composer's wishes without showing off himself, or adding his own spin on the music: "I am responsible to the composer, and particularly to the piece". Brendel cites, in addition to his mentor and teacher Edwin Fischer, pianists Alfred Cortot, Wilhelm Kempff, and the conductors Bruno Walter and Wilhelm Furtwängler as particular influences on his musical development.

Brendel has worked with younger pianists such as Paul Lewis, Amandine Savary, Till Fellner and, most recently, Kit Armstrong. He has also performed in concert and recorded with his son Adrian and has appeared in many Lieder recitals with Hermann Prey, Dietrich Fischer-Dieskau and Matthias Goerne.

In November 2007 Brendel announced that he would retire from the concert platform after his concert of 18 December 2008 in Vienna, which featured him as soloist in Mozart's Piano Concerto No. 9 in E-flat; the orchestra (the Vienna Philharmonic) was conducted by Sir Charles Mackerras. His final concert in New York was at Carnegie Hall on 20 February 2008, with works by Haydn, Mozart, Beethoven and Schubert. Since his debut at Carnegie Hall on 21 January 1973 he performed there 81 times, including complete cycles of Beethoven's piano sonatas in 1983 and 1993.

Personal life
Brendel has been married twice. His first marriage, from 1960 to 1972, was to Iris Heymann-Gonzala, which produced a daughter, Doris, who is a progressive rock and pop rock musician. In 1975, Brendel married Irene Semler, and the couple have three children; a son, Adrian, who is a cellist, and two daughters, Katharina and Sophie.

Recordings

 Alfred Brendel – Unpublished Live and Radio Performances 1968–2001
 Great Pianists of the 20th Century – Alfred Brendel III

Publications
Next to music, literature is Brendel's second life and occupation. His writings have appeared in English, German, French, Italian, Spanish, Dutch, Japanese, Korean, and other languages. For several years, he has been a contributor to The New York Review of Books. His books include:
 Musical Thoughts and Afterthoughts (essays) (1976)
 Music Sounded Out (1990) – essays, including "Must Classical Music be Entirely Serious?"
 One Finger Too Many (poetry) (1998)
 Alfred Brendel on Music (collected essays) (2001)
 Me, of All People: Alfred Brendel in Conversation with Martin Meyer (2002) (UK edition: The Veil of Order)
 Cursing Bagels (poetry) (2004)
 Playing the Human Game (collected poems) (2010) Phaidon Press

Bibliography
Musik, Sinn und Unsinn. Festschrift anläßlich der Hommage an Alfred Brendel (Berlin: Konzerthaus Berlin, 2017)

Awards and accolades
 Honorary Knight Commander of the Order of the British Empire (KBE; 1989)
 Pour le Mérite for Sciences and Arts (1991)
 Hans von Bülow Medal of the Berlin Philharmonic (1992)
 Beethoven-Ring of the Vienna Music University (2001)
 Léonie Sonning Music Prize (2002; Denmark)
 Ernst von Siemens Music Prize (2004)
 Prix Venenia: Premio Artur Rubinstein (2007)
 Praemium Imperiale (2009)
 Herbert von Karajan Music Prize (2008)
 Franz Liszt-Ehrenpreis (2011)
 Juilliard Medal (2011)
 Voted into the Gramophone Hall of Fame (2012)
 Golden Mozart Medal of the Salzburg Mozarteum (2014)
 Echo Klassik Lifetime Achievement Award (2016)

Brendel has been awarded honorary doctorates from universities including London (1978), Oxford (1983), Yale (1992), University College Dublin (2007), McGill Montreal (2011), Cambridge (2012) and York (2018) and holds other honorary degrees from the Royal College of Music, London (1999), New England Conservatory (2009), Hochschule Franz Liszt Weimar (2009) and The Juilliard School (2011). He is an honorary Fellow of Exeter College, Oxford and Peterhouse, Cambridge. He has received Lifetime Achievement Awards by Edison, Midem Classical Awards, Deutscher Schallplattenpreis, Gramophone, and ECHO Klassik.

In 2012, Limelight asked 100 pianists which other pianist inspired them the most. In addition to his student, Paul Lewis, Brendel was mentioned by three others. He was included in Peter Donohoe's "Fifty Great Pianists" series for BBC Radio 3, which aired in 2012.

References

External links 

 
 Alfred Brendel interview, 20 April 1991
 Alfred Brendel on Desert Island Discs. (BBC Radio 4, 2013)

1931 births
Living people
Austrian classical pianists
Male classical pianists
Fellows of Exeter College, Oxford
Deutsche Grammophon artists
Honorary Knights Commander of the Order of the British Empire
Honorary Members of the Royal Academy of Music
Members of the European Academy of Sciences and Arts
Musicians awarded knighthoods
Prize-winners of the Ferruccio Busoni International Piano Competition
Recipients of the Léonie Sonning Music Prize
Recipients of the Pour le Mérite (civil class)
Herbert von Karajan Music Prize winners
Royal Philharmonic Society Gold Medallists
Austrian expatriates in the United Kingdom
Moravian-German people
Austrian people of Moravian-German descent
People from Šumperk District
Ernst von Siemens Music Prize winners
Recipients of the Praemium Imperiale
Members of the German Academy for Language and Literature